ASJA Boys' College is a Muslim secondary school in San Fernando, Trinidad and Tobago. It was founded in 1960 by the Anjuman Sunnat ul Jamaat Association (ASJA), a muslim organization that operates mosques and schools in Trinidad.

Facilities 

Facilities at this institution includes:

 Information Technology Laboratory
 Biology/Physics Laboratory
 Chemistry Laboratory 
 Art Room
 Mosque 
 Auditorium
 Cricket Practice Area
 Basketball Court 
 Volleyball Court
 Library

References

External links 
 Official website

Schools in Trinidad and Tobago
Islamic schools in the Caribbean